Lissoceras is an involute, smooth or finely vetrolaterally ribbed, ammonite with a blunt, un-keeled venter, included in the Haploceratidae, that lived from the Lower Bajocian - Middle Oxfordian (Middle to Upper Jurassic) in what is now Europe, south Asia, and southern Alaska.

Lissoceratoides, once considered to be a subgenus of Lissoceras, is indistinguishable morphologically from it.

References
Notes

Bibliography
Arkell et al., 1957  Mesozoic Ammonoidea, Treatise on Invertebrate Paleontology Part L. Geol Society of America and Univ Kansas Press R.C Moore (ed) 1957  
D.T Donavan, J.H. Callomon, and M.K Howarth. 1981.  Classification of the Jurassic Ammonitina. In The Ammonoidea. M.R. House and J.R. Senior, eds. Systematics Assoc. Pub  Academic Press.

Haploceratoidea
Ammonitida genera
Middle Jurassic ammonites
Late Jurassic ammonites
Middle Jurassic ammonites of Europe
Late Jurassic ammonites of Europe
Jurassic ammonites of North America
Middle Jurassic North America
Late Jurassic North America
Bajocian first appearances
Late Jurassic extinctions